Çukurhüseyin railway station is a railway station near the village of Çukurhüseyin, Balıkesir in Turkey. TCDD Taşımacılık operates a daily intercity train from Izmir to Bandırma. Since passenger traffic is low, the station acts a siding to allow trains to pass.

References

External links
Çukurhüseyin station timetable

Railway stations in Balıkesir Province
Railway stations opened in 1912
1912 establishments in the Ottoman Empire